Samantha Martin is a Canadian singer and songwriter who has garnered critical acclaim for her blend of roots rock, blues, soul and gospel music, and exceptional vocals.

Career 
Drawing influences from Memphis soul greats such as Aretha Franklin and Brooklyn's Sharon Jones, Samantha Martin has been nominated for thirteen Maple Blues Awards to date, 4 times in 2019 and 3 times in 2020. Martin has released 5 full-length albums throughout her career. Following her debut record Back Home in 2008, she released the self-titled Samantha Martin and The Haggard in 2012. 

In 2014, Martin formed the soul and blues focused band "Samantha Martin & Delta Sugar". The band's debut record Send the Nightingale was released in 2015. The newly-formed band's name comes from Martin's love of southern blues traditions. While Martin's reputation as a vocal powerhouse continued to build, the songs on Send the Nightingale also reflected difficult times for Martin, whose mother was terminally ill at the time she was recording her album.

The band's debut full-length studio album, Send the Nightingale, earned Martin four nominations at 2015 Maple Blues Awards, including Best Female Vocalist, Best Songwriter, Best New Group, and Best New Album/Producer. 

In 2018, Samantha Martin & Delta Sugar signed a record deal with Gypsy Soul Records based out of Toronto. Her record Run to Me was released on April 28th, 2018. Eleven months after releasing their recording Run to Me, the 11-piece blues/soul band was nominated for a Juno Award for Blues Album of the Year.

Discography 
Albums

References

External links 

 
 
 
 
 

1983 births
Living people
Canadian women singer-songwriters
Canadian blues singers